Seligmann (sometimes Seligman) is a surname.

People bearing the name include:

The arts
 Chris Seligman, a keyboardist in Canadian band Stars
 Daniel Seligman (1924–2009), editor and columnist
 Ellen Seligman (died 2016), American-Canadian literary editor
 Emma Seligman, Canadian director and screenwriter
 Germain Seligman (1893–1978), French-born American art dealer based in New York
 Jacques Seligmann (1858–1923), antiquarian and art dealer active in Paris and New York
 Johann Michael Seligmann (1720–1762), German artist and engraver
 Kurt Seligmann (1900–1962), Swiss painter, writer
 Lincoln Seligman (born 1950), British artist
 Mariana Seligmann (born 1984), Argentinian actress
 Matthew Seligman (1955-2020), was an English bassist who took part in the New Wave scene in the 1970s and the 1980s
 Walter Herbert (conductor) (1898–1975), ne Seligmann, American conductor
 Werner Seligmann (1930–1998), architect, urban designer, and educator
 Seligmann Heller (1831–1890), Austrian poet and journalist

Business, law, and politics
 Aron Elias Seligmann (1747–1824), German Jewish financier
 Arthur Seligman (1873–1933), American businessman and politician
 Edwin Robert Anderson Seligman (1861–1939), American economist
 Isaac Seligman (1834–1928), German-American merchant banker and philanthropist
 Isaac Newton Seligman (1855–1917), American banker and communal worker
 Joseph Seligman (born Seligmann, 1819–1880), a German-American banker, founder of J. & W. Seligman & Co.
 Madron Seligman (1918–2002), British politician
 Naomi O. Seligman, member of the Board of Directors of Oracle Corporation
 Nicole Seligman (born 1957), American attorney and corporate director
 Scott Seligman (born 1951), American real estate developer and bank founder

Science and education
 Charles Gabriel Seligman (1873–1940), British anthropologist
 George Seligman (born 1927), American mathematician
 Joel Seligman (born 1950), tenth president of the University of Rochester
 Martin Seligman (born 1942), American psychologist and author, father of modern positive psychology movement

Religion
 Seligman Baer (1825–1897), masoretic scholar, and an editor of the Hebrew Bible and of the Jewish liturgy
 Seligman Baer Bamberger (1807–1878), Talmudist and a leader of Orthodox Judaism in Germany

Sportsmen
 Edgar Seligman (1867–1958), American-born British 6-time champion and 2-time Olympic fencing medalist
 Reade Seligmann, one of the three falsely accused students in 2006 Duke University lacrosse case
 Steve Seligman, American stock car racing driver

Jewish given names
Germanic given names
Jewish surnames
German-language surnames
Germanic-language surnames